Conor Dignam is an Irish lawyer who has been a judge of the High Court since December 2021. He was formerly a barrister.

Early life 
Dignam studied political science at Trinity College Dublin, graduating in 1992. He subsequently obtained a diploma in legal studies and trained to be a barrister at the King's Inns.

Legal career 
He was called to the Bar in 1996 and became a senior counsel in 2011. He practiced in the area of public law, with specialisations in child and health law.

The Health Service Executive appointed Dignam and Siobhán Phelan to represent interests of an unborn child in PP v. HSE in 2014. He acted for the Garda Síochána, Nóirín O'Sullivan and Martin Callinan at the Disclosures Tribunal.

He chaired an inquiry into the Leas Cross scandal in 2010 and was commissioned to write an investigative report arising out of the 'Grace' case.

Outside of practice, he was appointed a board member of Community Law & Mediation in 2020 and was the vice chair of the Bar Council of Ireland. He served as chair of the Bar Council's human rights committee and was a Bar Council representative on the Superior Courts Rules Committee.

Judicial career 
Dignam was one of three people nominated by the government in November 2021 to be appointed judges of the High Court. He was appointed on 6 December 2021.

References

Living people
High Court judges (Ireland)
Alumni of Trinity College Dublin
Alumni of King's Inns
Year of birth missing (living people)
Irish barristers